Vatica globosa is a tree in the family Dipterocarpaceae, native to Borneo. The specific epithet globosa means "spherical", referring to the nuts.

Description
The inflorescences bear cream flowers.

Distribution and habitat
Vatica globosa is endemic to Borneo.

Conservation
Vatica globosa has been assessed as endangered on the IUCN Red List. It is threatened mainly by shifting agricultural patterns and by palm oil plantations. In Kalimantan, the species is threatened by forest fires.

References

globosa
Endemic flora of Borneo
Plants described in 1967